Stade de Venoix was a multi-use stadium in Caen, France. It was initially used as the stadium of SM Caen matches.  It was replaced by the current Stade Michel d'Ornano in 1993.  The capacity of the stadium was 11,500 spectators.

External links
Stadium information

Stade Malherbe Caen
Defunct football venues in France
Sports venues completed in 1925
Sports venues in Calvados (department)